Federico Santiago Valverde Dipetta (born 22 July 1998) is a Uruguayan professional footballer who plays as a central midfielder for La Liga club Real Madrid and the Uruguay national team. A versatile player known for his pace, stamina, and work rate, he can also be deployed as a defensive midfielder, a right winger, and occasionally a right-back.

Club career
Valverde spent most of his youth career with Peñarol, where he quickly made an impression; he made his senior debut for the club in their first fixture of the 2015–16 season against Cerro. He became part of the Uruguayan national youth teams and attracted the interest of European clubs like Arsenal, Barcelona, Chelsea and Real Madrid.

Real Madrid
In July 2016 Valverde was transferred from Peñarol to Real Madrid, initially being assigned to their reserve team Castilla. Two months later, he made his debut for Castilla against Real Unión, in a game which his team eventually lost. He became a regular member of the Castilla line-up his debut season, and scored his first goal against Albacete in December 2016.

In regards to his growing importance to the team, Santiago Solari, his coach at Castilla, said on 29 January 2017, "I'm very happy with him. He has adapted very well to the club and country. Valverde always generates a lot of football in midfield."

Loan to Deportivo La Coruña
On 22 June 2017, Valverde was loaned to La Liga side Deportivo de La Coruña for one year. He made his debut in the competition on 10 September, replacing Fede Cartabia in a 2–4 home loss against Real Sociedad. Valverde contributed with 24 league appearances during the campaign, as the side suffered relegation.

2018: Return to Real Madrid
Upon returning from loan, Valverde impressed new manager Julen Lopetegui during the 2018–19 pre-season and was definitively assigned to the first-team. On 23 October 2018, Valverde made his official Real Madrid debut in the UEFA Champions League Group stage against Viktoria Plzeň at the Bernabéu at just 20 years old. He made 25 appearances and won the FIFA Club World Cup in his first season with the first team.

2019–present: First team breakthrough
With the return of Zinedine Zidane to the dugout and the departure of Marcos Llorente, Valverde broke through to become a key player of the squad during the 2019–20 season. On 9 November 2019, he scored his first goal for Real Madrid, in a 4–0 away win over Eibar in La Liga.

On 12 January 2020, Valverde tackled Álvaro Morata during the Supercopa de España Final against Atlético Madrid, committing a professional foul and stopping play with Morata clean through on goal. Valverde was sent off, but his actions stopped what was a likely goal, forced a penalty shootout which Real Madrid won, and earned him the Man of The Match award and widespread praise. Atlético Madrid manager Diego Simeone later referred to the tackle as "the most important play of the game". He made 33 appearances during the league season, as Real Madrid won the 2019–20 La Liga.

On 27 September, Valverde scored Real Madrid's first goal of the 2020–21 season away to Betis in La Liga in an eventual 3–2 win and was selected as the 'King of The Match'. This was also his 50th La Liga match for Los Blancos. One month later on 24 October, Valverde scored against Barcelona at the Camp Nou in just five minutes in an eventual 3–1 league win. He became just the second Uruguayan to score in El Clásico (after Luis Suárez) and the first for Real Madrid. One week later, Valverde scored again, against Huesca, in a 4–1 league win at the Alfredo Di Stéfano Stadium. This was his third goal of the season, meaning he had already scored more than in the entirety of the previous campaign.

On 24 August 2021, Valverde extended his contract until 2027. On 12 January 2022, he scored Real Madrid's third goal in a 3–2 win over Barcelona in extra time of the Supercopa de España semi-final, a tournament which Madrid eventually went on to win. On 28 May, he assisted Vinícius Júnior to score the winning goal in a 1–0 win over Liverpool in the 2022 UEFA Champions League Final to clinch a record 14th UEFA Champions League title for Real Madrid.

On 14 September 2022, he scored his first Champions League goal in a 2–0 victory over RB Leipzig.

International career

Valverde was awarded the Silver Ball at the 2017 FIFA U-20 World Cup as Uruguay finished fourth in the tournament.

He was called up to the senior squad for the first time in August 2017, debuted with the Uruguay national football team on 5 September of that year, and scored his first international goal with the senior team in a match against Paraguay. He was named in Uruguay's provisional 26-man pool for the 2018 FIFA World Cup, but he was left out of the final 23-man squad.

Valverde was included by manager Óscar Tabárez in the final 23-man Uruguay squad for the 2019 Copa América in Brazil. In the quarter-finals against Peru on 29 June, a 0–0 draw after regulation time saw the match go to a penalty shoot-out; Uruguay lost the shoot-out 4–5 and were eliminated from the competition.

In June 2021, he was selected to the squad at the 2021 Copa América.

Personal life
Valverde is in a relationship with Argentinian journalist and presenter, Mina Bonino. Together they have one son, Benicio, born on 20 February 2020.

Controversies
In 2017, Valverde was caught up in a controversial gesture after making a "slant eyes" celebration after scoring in the Under-20 World Cup. Valverde denied that the celebration was racist but stated that it was in homage to his first agent, Edgardo "El Chino" Lasalvia. FIFA called on Uruguay to explain Valverde's actions, as well as a celebratory photo of the squad in which several Celeste players made the same gestures.

Career statistics

Club

International

Scores and results list Uruguay's goal tally first.

Honours
Peñarol
Primera División: 2015–16

Real Madrid
La Liga: 2019–20, 2021–22
Supercopa de España: 2019–20, 2021–22
UEFA Champions League: 2021–22
UEFA Super Cup: 2022
FIFA Club World Cup: 2018, 2022

Individual
FIFA U-20 World Cup Silver Ball: 2017
UEFA La Liga Revelation Team of the year: 2019–20
La Liga Player of the Month: September 2022
FIFA Club World Cup Silver Ball: 2022

References

External links

1998 births
Living people
Footballers from Montevideo
Uruguayan footballers
Association football midfielders
Peñarol players
Real Madrid Castilla footballers
Real Madrid CF players
Deportivo de La Coruña players
Uruguayan Primera División players
Segunda División B players
La Liga players
UEFA Champions League winning players
Uruguay youth international footballers
Uruguay under-20 international footballers
Uruguay international footballers
2019 Copa América players
2021 Copa América players
2022 FIFA World Cup players
Uruguayan expatriate footballers
Expatriate footballers in Spain
Uruguayan expatriate sportspeople in Spain